La Femme: journal bi-mensuel was a French magazine for women between 1879 and 1937 published by the French Union nationale des amies de la jeune fille. It was published once or twice a month.

References

External links
 Catalog record at the Bibliothèque Nationale de France
 full text
 

1879 establishments in France
1937 disestablishments in France
Defunct magazines published in France
French-language magazines
Monthly magazines published in France
Women's magazines published in France
Magazines established in 1879
Magazines disestablished in 1937